In mathematics, the Baker–Campbell–Hausdorff formula is the solution for  to the equation

The first few terms of this series are:

Thus, we can say that near the identity the group multiplication in —written as —can be expressed in purely Lie algebraic terms. The Baker–Campbell–Hausdorff formula can be used to give comparatively simple proofs of deep results in the Lie group–Lie algebra correspondence.

Modern expositions of the formula can be found in, among other places, the books of Rossmann and Hall.

History 
The formula is named after Henry Frederick Baker, John Edward Campbell, and Felix Hausdorff who stated its qualitative form, i.e. that only commutators and commutators of commutators, ad infinitum, are needed to express the solution. An earlier statement of the form was adumbrated  by Friedrich Schur in 1890 where a convergent power series is given, with terms recursively defined. This qualitative form is what is used in the most important applications, such as the relatively accessible proofs of the Lie correspondence and in quantum field theory. Following Schur, it was noted in print by Campbell (1897); elaborated by Henri Poincaré (1899) and Baker (1902); and systematized geometrically, and linked to the Jacobi identity by Hausdorff (1906). The first actual explicit formula, with all numerical coefficients, is due to Eugene Dynkin (1947). The history of the formula is described in detail in the article of Achilles and Bonfiglioli and in the book of Bonfiglioli and Fulci.

Explicit forms 
(See, for example, the discussion of the relationship between Lie group and Lie algebra homomorphisms in Section 5.2 of Hall's book, where the precise coefficients play no role in the argument.) A remarkably direct existence proof was given by Martin Eichler, see also the "Existence results" section below.

Numerous formulas exist; we will describe two of the main ones (Dynkin's formula and the integral formula of Poincaré) in this section.

Dynkin's formula
Let G be a Lie group with Lie algebra . Let

be the exponential map.
The following general combinatorial formula was introduced by Eugene Dynkin (1947),

with the understanding that .

The first few terms are well-known, with all higher-order terms involving  and commutator nestings thereof (thus in the Lie algebra):

The above lists all summands of order 6 or lower (i.e. those containing 6 or fewer 's and 's). A complete elementary proof of this formula can be found in the article on the derivative of the exponential map.

An integral formula
A popular integral formula is

involving the generating function for the Bernoulli numbers,

utilized by Poincaré and Hausdorff.

Matrix Lie group illustration 
For a matrix Lie group  the Lie algebra is the tangent space of the identity I, and the commutator is simply ; the exponential map is the standard exponential map of matrices,

When one solves for Z in

The first, second, third, and fourth order terms are:
 
 
 
 

The formulas for the various 's is not the Baker–Campbell–Hausdorff formula. The point is that it is far from obvious that it is possible to express each  in terms of commutators. The general result that each  is expressible as a combination of commutators was shown in an elegant, recursive way by Eichler.

A consequence of the Baker–Campbell–Hausdorff formula is the following result about the trace:

Questions of convergence 

Then

(Similar examples may be found in the article of Wei.)

Thus, the conclusion that the product operation on a Lie group is determined by the Lie algebra is only a local statement. Indeed, the result cannot be global, because globally one can have nonisomorphic Lie groups with isomorphic Lie algebras.

Special cases 

Then the formula reduces to its first three terms.

Theorem: If  and  commute with their commutator, then .

This is the degenerate case used routinely in quantum mechanics, as illustrated below. This result is behind the "exponentiated commutation relations" that enter into the Stone–von Neumann theorem. A simple proof of this identity is given below.

Another useful form of the general formula emphasizes expansion in terms of Y and uses the adjoint mapping notation :

which is evident from the integral formula above. (The coefficients of the nested commutators with a single  are normalized Bernoulli numbers.)

Thus, the  term above vanishes and we obtain:

The restriction on  guarantees that the expression on the right side makes sense. (When  we may interpret .) We also obtain a simple "braiding identity":

which may be written as an adjoint dilation:

Existence results 

(See the section "Matrix Lie group illustration" above for formulas for the first several 's.)

Alternatively, we can give an existence argument as follows.

This is for instance the case in the Lorentzian construction of a Lie group representation from a Lie algebra representation. Existence can be seen as follows.

called the coproduct, such that
 and 
(The definition of Δ is extended to the other elements of S by requiring R-linearity, multiplicativity and infinite additivity.)

One can then verify the following properties:
  is grouplike (this means ) if and only if s is primitive (this means ).
 The grouplike elements form a group under multiplication.
 The primitive elements are exactly the formal infinite sums of elements of the Lie algebra generated by X and Y, where the Lie bracket is given by the commutator . (Friedrichs' theorem)

The existence of the Campbell–Baker–Hausdorff formula can now be seen as follows:

In common with all universal enveloping algebras, it has a natural structure of a Hopf algebra, with a coproduct . The ring  used above is just a completion of this Hopf algebra.

Zassenhaus formula 
A related combinatoric expansion that is useful in dual applications is

As a corollary of this, the Suzuki–Trotter decomposition follows.

An important lemma and its application to a special case of the Baker–Campbell–Hausdorff formula

The identity (Campbell 1897)
Let  be a matrix Lie group and  its corresponding Lie algebra. (The adjoint endomorphism encountered above.)

A standard combinatorial lemma which is utilized in producing the above explicit expansions is given by

so, explicitly,

This is a particularly useful formula which is commonly used to conduct unitary transforms in quantum mechanics. By defining the iterated commutator,

we can write this formula more compactly as,

or

An application of the identity

whose solution is

Taking  gives one of the special cases of the Baker–Campbell–Hausdorff formula described above:

More generally, for non-central , the following braiding identity further follows readily,

Infinitesimal case

A particularly useful variant of the above is the infinitesimal form. This is commonly written as

This variation is commonly used to write coordinates and vielbeins as pullbacks of the metric on a Lie group. 

For example, writing  for some functions  and a basis  for the Lie algebra, one readily computes that

for  the structure constants of the Lie algebra.  

The series can be written more compactly (cf. main article) as 

with the infinite series 

The usefulness of this expression comes from the fact that the matrix   is a vielbein. Thus, given some map  from some manifold  to some manifold , the metric tensor on the manifold  can be written as the pullback of the metric tensor  on the Lie group ,    

The metric tensor  on the Lie group is the Cartan metric, the Killing form. For  a (pseudo-)Riemannian manifold, the metric is a (pseudo-)Riemannian metric.

Application in quantum mechanics 

where  is the identity operator. It follows that  and  commute with their commutator.

This "exponentiated commutation relation" does indeed hold, and forms the basis of the Stone–von Neumann theorem. 

As indicated above, the expansion then collapses to the semi-trivial degenerate form:

where  is just a complex number.

This example illustrates the resolution of the displacement operator, into exponentials of annihilation and creation operators and scalars.

This degenerate Baker–Campbell–Hausdorff formula then displays the product of two displacement operators as another displacement operator (up to a phase factor), with the resultant displacement equal to the sum of the two displacements,

since the Heisenberg group they provide a representation of is nilpotent. The degenerate Baker–Campbell–Hausdorff formula is frequently used in quantum field theory as well.

See also 

 Matrix exponential
 Logarithm of a matrix
 Lie product formula (Trotter product formula)
 Lie group–Lie algebra correspondence
 Derivative of the exponential map
 Magnus expansion
 Stone–von Neumann theorem
 Golden–Thompson inequality

Notes

References

Bibliography 
 
 
 
 L. Corwin & F.P Greenleaf, Representation of nilpotent Lie groups and their applications, Part 1: Basic theory and examples, Cambridge University Press, New York, 1990, .
 
 
 
 
 
 Shlomo Sternberg (2004) Lie Algebras, Orange Grove Books,  free, online
 Veltman, M, 't Hooft, G & de Wit, B (2007). "Lie Groups in Physics", online lectures.

External links 
 C.K. Zachos, Crib Notes on CBH expansions 
 MathWorld page

Lie groups
Mathematical physics
Combinatorics
Exponentials